Behind the Rising Sun is a 1971 war novel by Nigerian novelist and politician Sebastian Okechukwu Mezu.  The novel was first published by Heinemann, and later reprinted in 1972 as part of the influential African Writers Series. The novel explores the events of the Nigerian Civil War (also known as the Biafra War). The novel is the first novel to deal with the war, following, and does so from a Biafran perspective. The novel suggests that the Nigerian victory in the war was not due to an aptitude by the Nigerian forces, but by the ineptitude of Baifran ability. Critic Wendy Griswald documents at least 28 novels that subsequently depict the conflict.

Critic Wendy Griswald describes the novel as "awkwardly constructed" and highlighting a sharp contrast between the novels's artificial ending and "realistic" depictions of suffering during the war.

References 

1971 Nigerian novels
Historical novels
African Writers Series
Biafra
Novels set during the Nigerian Civil War